Nahali may refer to the following languages of central India:

 Nihali language, or Nahali, a language isolate
 Kalto language, or Nahali, an Indo-Aryan language

See also
Nahari language, an Indo-Aryan language of Chhattisgarh and Odisha